Warmth is the third studio album by New York City-based electronic music group Blondes, released on R&S Records on August 11, 2017; they originally released records via RVNG Intl., but as the label moved their business model from issuing dance music to experimental music and re-releases of underground records, the duo moved to R&S to continue producing dance music.

References 

2017 albums
R&S Records albums